Sholinganallur is a state assembly constituency in the Chennai district of Tamil Nadu, India, that was formed after constituency delimitation in 2007. Its State Assembly Constituency number is 27. It is a part of the Chennai South parliamentary constituency for national elections.
It is one of the 234 State Legislative Assembly Constituencies in Tamil Nadu.

Election results

2021

2016

2011

References

Assembly constituencies of Tamil Nadu